Lonnie Rashid Lynn (born March 13, 1972), known by his stage name Common (formerly known as Common Sense), is an American rapper and actor. He debuted in 1992 with the album Can I Borrow a Dollar?, and gained critical acclaim with his 1994 album Resurrection. He maintained an underground following into the late 1990s. He achieved mainstream success through his work with the Soulquarians.

His first major-label album, Like Water for Chocolate (2000), received commercial success. In 2003, he won the Grammy Award for Best R&B Song for his feature on Erykah Badu's single "Love of My Life (An Ode to Hip-Hop)". His 2005 album Be was also successful and was nominated for Best Rap Album at the 2006 Grammy Awards. He received his second Grammy Award for Best Rap Performance by a Duo or Group for "Southside" (featuring Kanye West), from his 2007 album Finding Forever. His best-of album, Thisisme Then: The Best of Common, was released in late 2007. In 2011, he launched Think Common Entertainment, his own record label imprint, having previously released music under various other labels including Relativity, Geffen and GOOD Music.

Common won the 2015 Golden Globe Award for Best Original Song and the Academy Award for Best Original Song for "Glory", which he co-wrote and performed with frequent collaborator John Legend, from the 2014 film Selma where he co-starred as civil rights movement leader James Bevel. Common has also acted in films including Smokin' Aces, Street Kings, American Gangster, Wanted, Terminator Salvation, Date Night, Just Wright, Happy Feet Two, New Year's Eve, Run All Night, John Wick: Chapter 2, Smallfoot and Hunter Killer. He starred as Elam Ferguson from 2011 to 2014 on the AMC western TV series Hell on Wheels.

Early life 
Common was born on March 13, 1972, at the Chicago Osteopathic Hospital in Chicago's Hyde Park neighborhood. He is the son of educator and former principal of John Hope College Preparatory High School, Mahalia Ann Hines, and former ABA basketball player turned youth counselor Lonnie Lynn. He was raised in the Calumet Heights neighborhood. Lynn's parents divorced when he was six years old, resulting in his father moving to Denver, Colorado. This left Lynn to be raised by his mother; however, his father remained active in his life, and was able to get him a job with the Chicago Bulls as a teenager. Lynn attended Florida A&M University for two years under a scholarship and majored in business administration.

Music career

1987–1996: Career beginnings 
Lynn began rapping in the late 1980s, while a student at Luther High School South in Chicago, when he, along with two of his friends, formed C.D.R., a rap trio that opened for acts such as N.W.A and Big Daddy Kane. When C.D.R dissolved by 1991, Lynn began a solo career under the stage name of Common Sense. After being featured in the Unsigned Hype column of The Source magazine, he debuted as a solo artist in 1992 with the single "Take It EZ", followed by the album Can I Borrow a Dollar?.

With the 1994 release of Resurrection, Common Sense achieved a much larger degree of critical acclaim which extended beyond the Chicago music scene. The album sold relatively well and received a strong positive reaction among alternative and underground hip hop fans at the time. Resurrection was Common Sense's last album produced almost entirely by his long-time production partner, No I.D., who would later become a mentor to a young Kanye West.

In 1996, Common Sense appeared on the Red Hot Organization's compilation CD, America Is Dying Slowly (A.I.D.S.), alongside Biz Markie, Wu-Tang Clan, and Fat Joe, among many other prominent hip hop artists. The CD, meant to raise awareness of the AIDS epidemic among African American men, was heralded as "a masterpiece" by The Source magazine. He would later also contribute to the Red Hot Organization's Fela Kuti tribute album, Red Hot and Riot in 2002. He collaborated with Djelimady Tounkara on a remake of Kuti's track, "Years of Tears and Sorrow".

The song "I Used to Love H.E.R." from Resurrection ignited a feud with West Coast rap group Westside Connection. The lyrics of the song criticized the path hip hop music was taking, utilizing a metaphor of a woman to convey hip hop and were interpreted by some as directing blame towards the popularity of West Coast gangsta rap. Westside Connection first responded with the 1995 song "Westside Slaughterhouse," with the lyrics "Used to love H.E.R., mad cause I f*cked her". "Westside Slaughterhouse" also mentioned Common Sense by name, prompting the rapper to respond with the scathing Pete Rock-produced attack song "The Bitch in Yoo". Common Sense and Westside Connection continued to insult each other back and forth before finally meeting with Louis Farrakhan and setting aside their dispute. Following the popularity of Resurrection, Common Sense was sued by an Orange County-based reggae band with the same name, and was forced to shorten his moniker to simply Common.

1996–1999: One Day It'll All Make Sense  
Initially scheduled for an October 1996 release, Common finally released his third album, One Day It'll All Make Sense, in September 1997. The album took a total of two years to complete and included collaborations with artists such as Lauryn Hill, De La Soul, Q-Tip, Canibus, Black Thought, Chantay Savage, and Questlove – a future fellow member of the Soulquarians outfit. The album, which made a point of eschewing any gangsterism (in response to questions about his musical integrity), was critically acclaimed and led to a major label contract with MCA Records. In addition to releasing One Day, Common's first child, daughter Omoye Assata Lynn, was born shortly after the release of the album.

As documented by hip-hop journalist Raquel Cepeda, in the liner notes for the album, this event had a profound spiritual and mental effect on Common and enabled him to grow musically while becoming more responsible as an artist. She writes:

Rashid found out that he was going to become a daddy in about 8 months. Stunned and confused, Rashid had life-altering decisions to make with his girlfriend, Kim Jones. The situation led to the composition of his favorite cut on One Day... that offers a male slant on abortion. "Retrospect for Life", produced by James Poyser and No I.D. featuring Lauryn Hill (who was due on the same day as Rashid's girlfriend), is the song that is the driving force behind the project. Rashid listens to "Retrospect for Life" today at the mastering session geeked as if it were for the first time. He tells me as we listen to L-Boogie wail the chorus, "when I listen to the song now, I think about how precious her (Omoye's) life is".

Common addresses family ethics several times on One Day..., and the album sleeve is decorated with old family photos, illustrating the rapper's childhood, as well a quote from 1 Corinthians 13:11, which summarizes the path to manhood:

1999–2003: Soulquarians era 

Following One Day..., Common signed a major label record deal with MCA Records and relocated from Chicago to New York City in 1999. He began recording almost exclusively with a loose collective of musicians and artists (dubbed the "Soulquarians" by central figure Questlove) throughout 1999, and made a few sporadic guest appearances on The Roots' Things Fall Apart, and the Rawkus Records compilation, Soundbombing 2.

In 2000, his fourth album, Like Water for Chocolate, was released to mass critical acclaim. Executive produced by Questlove and featuring significant contributions by J Dilla, (who helmed many tracks except – "Cold Blooded", "Geto Heaven Part II", "A Song For Assata", "Pop's Rap Part 3...All My Children" & the DJ Premier-produced track "The 6th Sense"), Like Water for Chocolate transpired to be a considerable commercial breakthrough for Common, earning the rapper his first gold record, and greatly expanding his fanbase among critics and listeners alike.

With both artists hailing from the Great Lakes region of the United States (Chicago and Detroit, respectively), Common and J Dilla established their chemistry early on. Both became members of the Soulquarians collective, and collaborated on numerous projects together, even placing one song, "Thelonius", on both the Slum Village album Fantastic, Vol. 2, and Common's Like Water for Chocolate. As Dilla's health began to decline from the effects of Lupus Nephritis, he relocated to Los Angeles, and asked Common to make the move with him as a roommate (Dilla would later lose his battle with the rare disease).

This album saw Common exploring themes (musically and lyrically), which were uncommon for a hip-hop record, as he does on the song "Time Travelin' (A Tribute To Fela)"; a homage to Nigerian music legend, and political activist Fela Kuti. The most popular single from the album "The Light" was nominated for a Grammy Award.

In 2002, Common released his fifth album, Electric Circus. The album was highly anticipated and praised by many critics for its ambitious vision. However, it was not as commercially successful as his previous album, Like Water for Chocolate, selling under 300,000 copies. An eclectic album, Electric Circus featured fusions of several genres such as hip hop, pop, rock, electronic, and neo-soul. The album's style tended to divide critics; some praised its ambitious vision while others criticized it for the same reason. Most of the criticism tended to revolve around the album's experimental nature; some felt Common had strayed too far from his previous sound. This was Common's second and last album for MCA, and the label's final release prior to its absorption into Geffen Records.

Around this time, Common appeared as a guest performer on singer and fellow Soulquarian Bilal's Love for Sale album, recording a remake of the 1977 Fela Kuti song "Sorrow, Tears & Blood". Bilal also featured on Electric Circus, the first of many future collaborations with Common.

2004–2011: GOOD Music era 

In early 2004, Common made an appearance on fellow Chicagoan Kanye West's multi-platinum debut album, The College Dropout (on the song "Get Em High"), and announced his signing to West's then-newfound label GOOD Music. West had been a longtime fan of Common and the two even participated in a friendly on-air MC battle, where West took jabs at his lyrical idol for "going soft" and wearing crochet pants (as he does for his appearance in the video for the Mary J. Blige song "Dance for Me"). The pair worked together on Common's next album, Be, almost entirely produced by Kanye West, with some help from Common's longtime collaborator James Yancey (J Dilla) – also a favorite of West. The album was released in May 2005, and performed very well, boosted by Kanye's involvement and the singles "The Corner", and "Go". Be earned Common the second gold record of his career, with sales topping out at around 800,000 copies. The Source magazine gave it a near-perfect 4.5 mic rating, XXL magazine gave it their highest rating of "XXL", and AllHipHop gave the album 4 stars. The album was also nominated for four Grammy Awards in 2006.

Following the release of Be in 2005, several mixed-race artists from the UK hip-hop scene took exception to Common's comments about interracial relationships on the song "Real People." Yungun, Doc Brown and Rising Son recorded a track over an instrumental version of "The Corner" named "Dear Common (The Corner Dub)." Common states that he has heard of the track but never actually taken the time to listen to it, and has not retaliated in song.

Common's seventh LP titled Finding Forever was released on July 31, 2007. For this album, he continued his work with Kanye West, as well as other producers such as will.i.am, Devo Springsteen, Derrick Hodge, and Karriem Riggins, as well as the only J Dilla-produced track, "So Far To Go". The album features guest spots from artists such as Dwele, Bilal, D'Angelo, and UK pop starlet Lily Allen. The first single from the album was "The People" b/w "The Game". West predicted that Finding Forever would win the 2008 Grammy Award for Best Rap Album. The album was nominated for Best Rap Album, but did not win, losing to West's Graduation; however, Common did win his second Grammy for "Southside," which won the 2008 Grammy for Best Rap Performance by Duo or Group.
On July 31, 2007, Common performed a free concert in Santa Monica, California, on the 3rd Street Promenade to promote the release of Finding Forever. Common explained to the audience that the title "Finding Forever" represented his quest to find an eternal place in hip-hop and also his wishes to be an artist for the rest of his life. The album debuted at #1 on the national Billboard 200 charts.

In an August 2007 interview with XXL, rapper Q-Tip of the group A Tribe Called Quest stated that he and Common were forming a group called The Standard, and were planning to record an album to be produced by Q-Tip; however, this never came to fruition.

Common was instrumental in bridging the trans-Atlantic gap by signing UK's Mr. Wong and J2K to Kanye West's Getting Out Our Dreams recording outfit. Common met the pair during his tour in the UK earlier on in the year. It is speculated that the deal is not only to bring the UK and US hip hop genres together but that to rival Syco Music's cross-Atlantic success with Leona Lewis. He also has a deal with Zune mp3 players. In 2008 Common made an estimated 12 million dollars, making him equal in earnings to Eminem and Akon, tied for the 13th highest grossing Hip-Hop artist.

The eighth album from Chicago hip-hop artist Common was originally scheduled to be released on June 24, 2008, under the name Invincible Summer, but he announced at a Temple University concert that he would change it to Universal Mind Control. The release date was pushed back to September 30, 2008, due to Common filming Wanted. The release date was set for November 11, 2008, however, it was once again pushed back to December 9, 2008.

The album's eponymous lead single "Universal Mind Control", was officially released on July 1, 2008, via the US iTunes Store as part of The Announcement EP (sold as Universal Mind Control EP in the UK). The song features Pharrell, who also produced the track. The Announcement EP included an additional track titled "Announcement", also featuring Pharrell. The video for the lead single was filmed in September by director Hype Williams. In 2009, Common was prominently featured throughout his GOOD Music label-mate Kid Cudi's debut album Man on the Moon: The End of Day, as a narrator and featured artist. In late 2009, it was revealed Common was nominated for two Grammys at the 52nd Annual Grammy Awards, including Best Rap Performance by a Duo or Group for "Make Her Say", alongside Kid Cudi and Kanye West, as well as Best Rap Album for Universal Mind Control.

2011–present: Think Common Ent.

The Dreamer/The Believer and feud with Drake 
American producer No I.D., stated that he and Kanye West would be producing Common's album The Dreamer/The Believer. In July 2011, it was announced that No I.D. would be the album's sole producer. Common made an appearance on The Jonas Brothers' most recent album, Lines, Vines and Trying Times as a guest rapper for the group's 2009 song, "Don't Charge Me for the Crime."

On July 6, 2011, Common released his first single, titled "Ghetto Dreams", from his next album. A second single, "Blue Sky", was released on October 4, 2011. On December 20, 2011, Common released his ninth solo album, titled The Dreamer, The Believer. Although he left GOOD Music in 2011, Common was featured on the label's first compilation album, 2012's Cruel Summer. Common released a song entitled "Sweet", from The Dreamer/The Believer, which included lyrics critical of rappers who sing, although this criticism was not aimed specifically at Canadian recording artist Drake. Drake took offense and responded by releasing "Stay Schemin'", a song with Rick Ross and French Montana. Common fans only had to wait two-and-a-half days for him to respond to Drake's diss track. On February 13, 2012, Common commented on the feud by saying "It's over. But it was all in the art of hip hop. He said some things to me so I had to say some things back...I wouldn't say [he started it] but I know I heard something that I felt was directed to me so I addressed it. That's all. But you know, thank God we were able to move forward from it and all is good."

Artium Recordings and Nobody's Smiling 
After a quiet 2012, Common announced he would release an extended play (EP) in January 2013, and his first mixtape in April. In February 2013, Common announced his tenth solo studio album would be released in September 2013 and will feature Kanye West and production from Kanye West and No I.D. Later on September 8, 2013, he gave an update to his projects saying the previously announced EP would be released soon, and would feature a song with new Def Jam signee Vince Staples. He also told HipHopDX, his tenth solo studio album would be released in early 2014.

On January 6, 2014, Common announced his tenth studio album to be titled Nobody's Smiling and would be produced entirely by longtime collaborator No I.D.. The album, which Common revealed was originally going to be an EP, is set to feature Vince Staples, James Fauntleroy and "some new artists from Chicago." The concept of the album was inspired by his troubled hometown of Chicago: "We came up with this concept 'nobody's smiling.' It was really a thought that came about because of all the violence in Chicago," he says. "It happens in Chicago, but it's happening around the world in many ways." He continues, "We was talking about the conditions of what's happening, when I say 'nobody's smiling.' But it's really a call to action." On June 4, 2014, it was announced Common signed a recording contract with Def Jam Recordings and No I.D.'s Artium Records. It was also announced Nobody's Smiling would be released July 22, 2014. Lonnie "Pops" Lynn was to be featured on this album as well but the recording fell through as Lonnie's health declined. A recording was indeed made and is in process of being released on Dirty Laboratory Productions featuring production by AwareNess. 
In 2016 Common released his eleventh studio album titled Black America Again under Def Jam Recordings, the album featured guest appearances by Stevie Wonder, Bilal, Marsha Ambrosius, BJ The Chicago Kid, John Legend, PJ, Syd, Elena & Tasha Cobbs. The album was primarily produced by Karriem Riggins alongside many other contributors including Robert Glasper.

In 2018, Common also announced he would be forming a jazz group called August Greene with Karriem Riggins & Robert Glasper, shortly after this announcement an August Greene album was released through a partnership with Amazon Music. The album featured guest vocals (credited and uncredited) by male singer Samora Pinderhughes and featured award-winning singer Brandy Norwood on two songs titled "Optimistic" and "Time" respectively. On August 30, 2019, Common released his twelfth solo studio album titled Let Love, the album was released by Loma Vista Recordings and Concord Records. The album features guest appearances from Samora Pinderhughes, Daniel Caesar, Swizz Beatz, Leikeli47, BJ the Chicago Kid, A-Trak, Jill Scott, Leon Bridges and Jonathan McReynolds and production of the album was primarily handled by Karriem Riggins and the song titled "HER Love (feat. Daniel Caesar was produced by J. Dilla.

In 2020 Common released a nine-track album titled A Beautiful Revolution Pt. 1. The album features female singer PJ on seven tracks and also features guest vocals from Black Thought and Lenny Kravitz. In 2021 he released a sequel album, A Beautiful Revolution Pt. 2, which features guest vocals from Jessica Care Moore,  PJ, Black Thought, Seun Kuti, Marcus King, Isaiah Sharkey, Brittany Howard, and Morgan Parker. Production of both albums was handled primarily by long-time collaborator Karriem Riggins, with various other producers credited as session musicians.

Other work

Acting 

In 2003, Common appeared on the American UPN sitcom Girlfriends. In the episode "Take This Poem and Call Me in the Morning", he appeared as Omar, a slam poet who competes with fellow poet Sivad (played by Saul Williams) for the affection of Lynn Searcy (played by Persia White). He also had a cameo appearance on an episode of UPN's One on One, where he played a drama class instructor named Darius. He also made an appearance on the ABC show Scrubs. In 2007, Common appeared with Ryan Reynolds, Jeremy Piven, and Alicia Keys in the crime film Smokin' Aces, making his big screen debut as villainous Mob enforcer Sir Ivy. He appeared alongside Denzel Washington, Russell Crowe, The RZA and T.I. in the 2007 crime thriller American Gangster. On January 20, 2007, one week before the opening of Smokin Aces, he appeared in a Saturday Night Live sketch as himself. The show's host was Piven, his Aces co-star.

In 2007, Common played the role of Smokin' Aces co-star Alicia Keys's boyfriend in the music video "Like You'll Never See Me Again".

In 2008, he had a supporting role in the film adaptation of the comic book Wanted alongside Morgan Freeman and Angelina Jolie. Common also appeared in the movie Street Kings with Keanu Reeves, Hugh Laurie, The Game, and Forest Whitaker. Common also starred in the 2010 movie Just Wright as a basketball player who falls in love with his physical therapist Queen Latifah. He appeared in the 2009 film Terminator Salvation as John Connor's lieutenant Barnes.

In 2009, Common was cast as John Stewart/Green Lantern in the unproduced film Justice League: Mortal.

Common starred as a corrupt cop in the 2010 comedy Date Night with Steve Carell and Tina Fey. He was also featured in the role of deployed soldier Chino in 2011's New Year's Eve, the husband of Halle Berry's character, Nurse Aimee.

He was part of the ensemble cast of AMC's Hell on Wheels, as one of the lead characters, Elam Ferguson, a recently freed slave trying to find his place in the world.

In 2013, Common played the role of Agent Evans, an FBI agent in Now You See Me along with Mark Ruffalo, Jesse Eisenberg, Woody Harrelson, Isla Fisher, and Dave Franco. In the 2014 film Selma, for which he also co-wrote the Oscar-winning song "Glory", Common co-starred as 1960s civil rights movement leader James Bevel. In 2015, he played a hitman in Run All Night.

Common appeared as a gangster in the 2016 film Suicide Squad, directed by David Ayer and part of the DC Extended Universe.

In December 2015, Common appeared in the NBC TV special The Wiz Live!, as the Bouncer guarding the Emerald City.

In 2016, he co-starred in the film Barbershop: The Next Cut, alongside former rival Ice Cube.

In February 2017, he appeared alongside Keanu Reeves again, this time as professional hitman/bodyguard Cassian in John Wick: Chapter 2.

In August 2017, Common began voicing Kiburi the crocodile in Disney Junior's The Lion Guard.

Common played opposite Mary Elizabeth Winstead in Eva Vives's debut feature, All About Nina, which had its world premiere at the 2018 Tribeca Film Festival. It was a major, breakout role for which he has received much critical acclaim (Variety's Peter Debruge calling his performance "easily the strongest of the half-dozen supporting roles he's had this year"). That same year, he appeared as Rear Admiral John Fisk in the action thriller film Hunter Killer.

In 2018, Common starred in the film adaptation of The Hate U Give, playing Starr's uncle Carlos, a black police officer that is forced to defend his colleague that is involved in the shooting of a black teen.

In September 2022, it was announced that Common would make his Broadway debut in Second Stage Theater’s Between Riverside and Crazy in the winter of 2022.

Film production 
On October 27, 2015, Common inked a two-year deal with HBO that allowed to start his own film production company, Freedom Road Productions. He stated in an interview in February 2012 that one of his big career goals was to start his own film production company.

In 2016 Common also worked with Amazon Studios and American Girl, serving as an executive producer for the direct-to-video feature An American Girl Story – Melody 1963: Love Has to Win.

Modeling and clothing 

In 2006, Common was a model for photos of The Gap's fall season collection, appearing on posters in stores. Later that year, he performed in The Gap's "Holiday in Your Hood" themed Peace Love Gap. In February 2007, Common signed a deal with New Era to promote their new line of Layers fitted caps. Common also stars in a television commercial for the 2008 Lincoln Navigator. He appears in NBA 2K8 in NBA Blacktop mode. In the fall of 2008, Common appeared in an ad for Microsoft's Zune, comparing his new song, "Universal Mind Control", to "Planet Rock", a song from hip-hop pioneer Afrika Bambaataa. Also, he featured in the Diesel campaign for a new fragrance called "Only The Brave". His song "Be (intro)" is featured in a commercial for BlackBerry .

In December 2008, Common launched a new clothing line in partnership with Microsoft titled "Softwear", based on 1980s computing.

Writing 
Common was invited by First Lady Michelle Obama to appear at a poetry reading on May 11, 2011, at the White House. His poetry was found to be greatly influenced by Maya Angelou's works. This invitation caused furor with the New Jersey State Police and their union, who cited some of Common's previous lyrical content, most notably the song "A Song For Assata" about Assata Shakur, a member of the Black Liberation Army (and step-aunt of deceased rapper Tupac Shakur) who was convicted in 1977 of the first-degree murder of New Jersey state trooper Werner Foerster. At another poetry reading, Common had stated, "flyers say 'free Mumia' on my freezer", a reference to Mumia Abu-Jamal, who was controversially convicted of killing Philadelphia Police Officer Daniel Faulkner in 1981.

Jay Carney, the White House Press Secretary at the time, stated that President Obama opposed these particular lyrics, but supported what Common stood for more broadly. Common responded by saying: "I guess Sarah Palin and Fox News doesn't like me." On Facebook, he also stated, "The one thing that shouldn't be questioned is my support for the police officers and troops that protect us every day." Common later discussed the matter with Jon Stewart during a September 14, 2011, appearance on Comedy Central's The Daily Show.

In September 2011, Common published his memoir, One Day It'll All Make Sense, through Atria Books. As the book details how his close relationship with his mother influenced his life, it is partially narrated by her.

Common released his second memoir, Let Love Have The Last Word, in May 2019. The book highlights his relationship with his daughter Omoye, romantic relationships, his parents, and his struggle to cement his perspective in the concept of love.

Activism 
Common is a vegan and he is a supporter of animal rights and PETA. He appeared in a print advertisement for PETA titled "Think Before You Eat," and in a documentary titled Holistic Wellness for the Hip-Hop Generation where he promoted vegetarianism.

Common is also part of the "Knowing Is Beautiful" movement, which supports HIV/AIDS awareness. He is featured in the video for "Yes We Can," a song in support of the candidacy of Barack Obama, which made its debut on the internet on February 2, 2008. Common has pledged to stop using anti-gay lyrics in his music.

Common is the founder of the Common Ground Foundation, a non-profit that seeks to empower underprivileged youth to be contributing citizens and strong leaders in the world. The foundation includes programs dedicated to leadership development & empowerment, educational development, creative expression, as well as a book club. In 2014, Common Ground inaugurated the AAHH! Fest music festival in Chicago's Union Park. After a one-year hiatus, AAHH! Fest returned in 2016, but was canceled one week before showtime in 2017. An official announcement stated the fest would return September 15, 2018.

In 2017, Common performed concerts in several California prisons, as well as on the grounds of the California State Capitol. This concert tour inspired him to found Imagine Justice, another non-profit organization, devoted to empowering communities and fighting injustice. The organization intends to address mental health and wellness, civic engagement, and leveraging the power of art to inspire and spark change; it plans to execute high impact initiatives.

In May 2020, in response to the COVID-19 pandemic, Common launched a social media campaign through Imagine Justice, dubbed #WeMatterToo, with dozens of advocacy and activist groups calling attention to the threat that the pandemic poses for incarcerated men and women and intended to create greater public awareness about conditions facing incarcerated populations. The campaign includes the production of short films that will include recordings of inmates expressing their concern about the coronavirus spreading inside prisons.

Along with other rappers and activists, Common appeared in the award-winning documentary short film #Bars4Justice, which was shot in Ferguson, Missouri and produced by Nation19 Magazine. Common performed with Andra Day in the opening musical performance for the March for Our Lives anti-gun violence rally in Washington, D.C. on March 24, 2018. He also performed at the 50th anniversary of Martin Luther King's death in Memphis, at an event co-hosted by the labor union UNITE HERE. Common was later accused of joining anti-union efforts by crossing a UNITE HERE picket line in Boston.

Personal life 
Common is a vegan. He is a lifelong fan of the Chicago Bulls and Chicago Bears. He is a Christian, attending Trinity United Church of Christ in Chicago. On May 4, 2019, Common served as spring commencement speaker at the Florida Agricultural and Mechanical University (FAMU) and after his address, was awarded an honorary DFA degree. While at FAMU, he studied in the School of Business and Industry.

Common was in a relationship with comedian and actress Tiffany Haddish from mid-2020 to November 2021.

Discography 

Studio albums
 Can I Borrow a Dollar? (1992)
 Resurrection (1994)
 One Day It'll All Make Sense (1997)
 Like Water for Chocolate (2000)
 Electric Circus (2002)
 Be (2005)
 Finding Forever (2007)
 Universal Mind Control (2008)
 The Dreamer/The Believer (2011)
 Nobody's Smiling (2014)
 Black America Again (2016)
 Let Love (2019)
 A Beautiful Revolution (Pt. 1) (2020)
 A Beautiful Revolution (Pt. 2) (2021)

Filmography

Film

Television

Video games

Awards and nominations

References

External links 

 
 Common: Geffen Records Site
 
 
 Common on Democracy Now! – video interview

 
1972 births
Living people
21st-century American male actors
African-American male rappers
African-American male actors
African-American non-fiction writers
American non-fiction writers
American male film actors
American male television actors
American male video game actors
American male voice actors
American memoirists
Best Original Song Academy Award-winning songwriters
Florida A&M University alumni
Def Jam Recordings artists
Golden Globe Award-winning musicians
Grammy Award winners for rap music
Hip hop activists
Male actors from Chicago
Midwest hip hop musicians
Native Tongues Posse
Primetime Emmy Award winners
Rappers from Chicago
Songwriters from Illinois
Warner Records artists
Writers from Chicago
21st-century American rappers
August Greene members
African-American songwriters
Soulquarians members
Cocaine 80s members